The Men's 4x100 Medley Relay event at the 11th FINA World Aquatics Championships was swum on July 31, 2005 in Montreal, Quebec, Canada. 21 national teams swam in the Preliminary heats of the event in the morning; with the top-8 fastest teams advancing to swim again in the Final that evening.

At the start of the event, the existing World (WR) and Championships (CR) records were:
WR: 3:30.68,  USA, swum August 21, 2004 in Athens, Greece
CR: 3:31.54,  USA, swum July 27, 2003 in Barcelona, Spain

Results

Final

Preliminaries

References

Swimming at the 2005 World Aquatics Championships